Lake Tahoe Unified School District (LTUSD) is a public school district in El Dorado County, California, United States. Included in the district are four primary (elementary) schools, one middle school, one high school, a continuation high school, and one independent learning school. As of 2014, the district has a total enrollment of 3881 across its eight schools and has enjoyed minor growth from the previous year.

As of July 2015, the school's superintendent is James R. Tarwater, Ed.D. The assistant superintendent is Ivone Larson, who was the previous principal of South Tahoe High School. The school board members are Barbara Bannar (president), Angela Swanson (clerk), Troy Matthews, Larry Reilly and Bonnie Turnbull.

Enrollment 
LTUSD has eight total schools. From 1996 to 2013, the enrollment across the entire district has gone down over 30%. However, the enrollment of fall 2014 was 3881, up from 3855 from 2013. 11% of the district's students receive special education; 59.9% of its students qualify for free or reduced lunch, and 6.3% are homeless.

The following is a table complete with enrollment information about each school, with the exclusion of the Independent Learning Academy and inclusion of the district's Transitional Learning Center:

Faculty 
The current superintendent is James R. Tarwater, Ed. D. and the superintendent is Ivone Larson, who was the principal of South Tahoe High School from 2006 to 2014. Each member of the board of education serves a distinct area of South Lake Tahoe and the surrounding area. The following details each board member and which zone serve:

The faculty, and especially Tarwater, have been supportive of a pilot program to provide every student with a chromebook free of charge. In 2015, the district approved of the purchase of an additional 1000 new chromebooks for the 2015–2016 school year.

Schools

South Tahoe High School 

South Tahoe High School was founded in 1952 in South Lake Tahoe. The school mascot is the Viking and the school's colors are blue and gold. Its enrollment is the highest of any school that belongs to LTUSD, at 984 in 2014. The school's campus was originally at the current South Tahoe Middle School, but it was later moved to its present location. The current school was built in an open-air style with most of the buildings not connected to each other with hallways. The Angora Fire came within a quarter mile of the high school in June 2007. Dozens of firefighters had to surround the school to defend it from the flames.

From 2009, the school began a $64.5 million venture to renovate many of their facilities and completed their goals by 2013. In the summer of 2011, the school began constructing a new student union, a new art building (Tahoe Arts Design Academy) and began rebuilding their "Viking Stadium." The Tahoe Arts Design Academy was modeled after a Hollywood studio and features a 300-seat theatre. Ivone Larson, the principal of South Tahoe 2006–2014, was promoted to assistant superintendent and Chad Houck took over as the current principal.

South Tahoe Middle School 

South Tahoe Middle School is the only middle school that belongs to LTUSD. The school's mascot is the timberwolf. Its enrollment was 817 in 2014. Its campus does not feature an open-air style campus, unlike South Tahoe High School. The current track was built in 2007 after a $250,000 donation was given to the school by Ray Sidney, a former Google Engineer.

Elementary schools 
LTUSD has three traditional schools (Bijou Community School, Sierra House Elementary, and Tahoe Valley Elementary) and one magnet elementary school (Environmental Magnet School, located in Meyers, which (as its name suggests, along with its location near Lake Tahoe) has a special focus on environmental sciences).

References

External links
 
 List of specific school websites

School districts in El Dorado County, California